Manx Ark Project is a project to provide sanctuary for rare animal breeds (sheep, cattle, pigs and goats) at a number of farm sites in the Isle of Man.

References

External links
The Manx Ark Project website

Nature conservation in the Isle of Man
Agriculture in the Isle of Man